Tanjung Bara Coal Terminal, abbreviated as TBCT, or commonly known as Tanjung Bara, is a coal loading port in Indonesia. Primarily known for its coal loading terminal, it lies on the southeast coast of East Kalimantan, Borneo.

Location
Tanjung Bara is located on the island of Kalimantan, in the East Kutai Regency. The closest city to Tanjung Bara is Bontang.

Port information
The port of Tanjung Bara is often also known as TBCT (Tanjung Bara Coal Terminal).

The closest town to the port is the town of Sangatta; the capital of East Kutai Regency, which lies north of Bontang and Samarinda.

The port is owned and operated by Kaltim Prima Coal, a joint venture of BP and Rio Tinto.

Taboneo (Banjarmasin) and Tanjung Bara (TBCT) are among the largest coal loading ports of Indonesia.

References

Geography of East Kalimantan
Coal terminals
Coal in Indonesia
Ports and harbours of Indonesia